

Amazon

Box sets

Diamond

Puck Series (2013) 
Released to coincide with The Wolverine as a Hasbro Previews Exclusive, this features BAF Puck. Planned, though not released were an alternate version of Cyclops in his Phoenix Force outfit and a modern version of Rogue as an alternative figure to Emma Frost.

Disney Store
A five-pack featuring rereleased or repainted figures from previous waves, some of which had not previously been available in Europe. It was released in European Disney Stores to coincide with the release of Avengers: Age of Ultron.

EntertainmentEarth.com

GameStop

HasbroToyShop.com (2008)
Hasbro has a long tradition of doing "Fans' Choice" figures for their Star Wars license, but this is their first shot for Marvel Legends. In a poll run through ToyFare magazine, fans could pick which of eight Marvel characters they'd want to see as an exclusive, and Sunfire beat out Silver Samurai and Gambit.The figure is packaged on a unique blister card with a fiery backdrop and a large cardboard wrap around the bottom.

HASCON

Hasbro Pulse

HasLab
Premium crowdfunded items that are too expensive, massive or niche to see traditional retail releases. The project was launched with a 26.3-inch (669 mm) Sentinel, the largest Marvel Legends figure to date.

Marvel Unlimited Online
Free with the purchase of a new Marvel Unlimited Plus digital comics subscription at Marvel.com.

Movie Comic Media London Comic Convention

San Diego Comic Convention

Box Sets

Target

Red Hulk Series (2008)
This Marvel Legends BAF series consisted of seven figures, each of which is paired with one of the six parts needed to build Red Hulk.

Box Sets

Toys "R" Us

Jubilee Series (2014)
This wave was released with poor distribution, it was then supposed to ship to comic shops a few weeks later, but before that could happen Hasbro announced to Diamond that it had sold out of the assortment, making this, ultimately, an exclusive Toys "R" Us collection.

Box Sets

Walgreens

Walmart

Build-A-Figure

Box Sets

References 

Hasbro products
2000s toys
2010s toys
Marvel Comics action figure lines